The 38th Metro Manila Film Festival (MMFF) is a part of the annual film festival in Metro Manila, Philippines held from December 25, 2012 until January 8, 2013. During the festival, no foreign films are shown in Philippine theaters in order to showcase locally produced films (except in select 3D cinemas and IMAX theaters).

Entries
In the last week of May 2012, film producers and companies already submitted their scripts in participation with the festival. However, it will still be reviewed by the Metropolitan Manila Development Authority to sort out entries. Of the fifteen film entries submitted, eight were chosen as the official entries. Mga Kwento ni Lola Basyang was one of the eight entries chosen, but the producer sent a letter to MMDA to pull out of the film festival. On October 19, 2012 it was replaced by Nora Aunor's Thy Womb.

Here are the eight official entries:

Official entries
The eight films with the highest lobbying placement fee paid were chosen to be the official entries.

New Wave entries
The New Wave films were screened from December 18 to 22 as a prelude to the MMFF opening on December 25, 2012. This year, the MMFF will continue the tradition of supporting independent films through a bigger, better and bolder New Wave Section.
 Ad Ignorantiam - Armando Y. Lao
 Gayak - Ronaldo Bertubin
 In Nomine Matris - Will Fredo
 Paglaya sa Tanikala - Michael Angelo Dagnñalan
 The Grave Bandits - Tyrone Acierto

Student shorts
These films were screened along with the New Wave entries.
 Kinse - Nikki Del Carmen, Mowelfund Film Institute
 Lugaw - Nikko Arcega & Minette Palcon, Mowelfund Film Institute
 Manibela - Bobby Pagotan, Far Eastern University
 Obsesyon - Danny Yu, Mowelfund Film Institute
 Pukpok - Joaquin Pantaleon, De La Salle University
 Ritwal - Samantha Fe Solidum, University of San Carlos
 Rolyo - Rea Abalos, Mowelfund Film Institute
 Sonata - Moises Anthony Cruz, University of the Philippines Diliman
 Tagad - Daniel Bautista, University of San Carlos
 Tsansa - John Paul Pepito, Cebu Normal University

Awards

The 38th Metro Manila Film Festival Awards Night was held at the Meralco Theater in Ortigas Center, Pasig on December 27, 2012.

Winners are listed first and highlighted in boldface.

Major awards

New Wave category

1st CinePhone Film Festival

Special awards

Multiple awards

Mainstream

New Wave

Box office gross
The Metro Manila Development Authority was criticized for only releasing the official earnings of the Top 4 films in the days leading up to the festival's conclusion.

References

External links

Metro Manila Film Festival
MMFF
MMFF
MMFF
2012 in Philippine cinema
2013 in Philippine cinema